Dang Wangi LRT station is an underground metro station, in Kuala Lumpur, Malaysia, part of the Kelana Jaya Line (formerly known as PUTRA). The station was opened on June 1, 1999, as part of the line's second and latest extension, which includes the addition of 12 stations (not including Sri Rampai station), and an underground line that the Dang Wangi station is connected to. The Dang Wangi station is one of only five underground stations in the Kelana Jaya Line.

Location
The station's access point is situated on the northeastern tip of central or old Kuala Lumpur along Jalan Ampang (Malay; English: Ampang Road), with Bukit Nanas (Pineapple Hill) directly across the road and the Klang River behind the station. The station's name, Dang Wangi, is derived from Jalan Dang Wangi (Dang Wangi Road), a road that intersects with Jalan Ampang 100 metres south. The station is primarily intended to serve the northeastern region of central Kuala Lumpur, as well as several office buildings northwards along the road towards the Golden Triangle, the latter additionally provided with Kuala Lumpur Monorail stations after 2003. Dang Wangi station are located close to the Capital Square mixed development.

Interchange
The Dang Wangi station is located less than one kilometer west from the Bukit Nanas monorail station, also located beside Bukit Nanas. Despite the distance, official transit maps designate both stations as an interchange station between the Kelana Jaya Line and the Kuala Lumpur Monorail. Accordingly, passengers who intend to switch to either lines must walk along Jalan Ampang to reach either stations. No proper shelters were initially provided for the route between the stations; in the mid-2000s, canopies along sidewalks were erected between the stations. An overhead footbridge directly in front of the Dang Wangi station, which crosses Jalan Ampang and includes escalators, was also constructed around the time.

Alternately, the Medan Tuanku Monorail station is also accessible from the back exit of Dang Wangi station, via a pedestrian bridge across the Klang River and then a short walk along Jalan Raja Abdullah and Jalan Sultan Ismail.

Layout and design
The Dang Wangi station, like all other underground Kelana Jaya Line stations, is of basic construction consisting of only three levels: the entrance level at street level, and the concourse and platform levels underground. All levels are linked via escalators and stairways, while elevators are additionally provided between the concourse level and the platform level. The station contains only one island platform for two tracks of opposite directions, with floor-to-ceiling platform screen doors sealing the platform from the tracks.

The station has only one entry and exit point from street level, adjoining a massive low-rise structure behind the vestibule.

See also

 Rail transport in Malaysia

External links 
Dang Wangi LRT Station - mrt.com.my

Kelana Jaya Line
Railway stations opened in 1999
1999 establishments in Malaysia
20th-century architecture in Malaysia